The 2018 season was the 142nd season of competitive soccer in Canada.

News and events

2026 FIFA World Cup 

As part of the United 2026 World Cup bid with the United States and Mexico, the Canadian Soccer Association announced on March 15 that the three potential Canadian host cities were Edmonton, Montreal, and Toronto.  The 2026 FIFA World Cup was awarded to the United bid on June 13.

National teams 
John Herdman was named as head coach of the men's national team in January, replacing Octavio Zambrano.  Mauro Biello was later named assistant coach of the men's national team.  Kenneth Heiner-Møller was named as head coach of the women's national team following Herdman's departure.

Women's National Team Assistant Coach Bev Priestman stepped down from her position at the end of August.

Canadian Premier League 
The Canadian Premier League announced that it will kick off in April 2019, with Paul Beirne as its president, David Clanachan as its commissioner, and James Easton as its head of soccer operations.

On March 28, the Canadian Premier League and the Canadian Soccer Association announced the creation of the Canadian Soccer Business (CSB); an organization "representing commercial assets and inventory for marquee soccer properties in Canada", including "all corporate partnerships and broadcast rights related to Canada Soccer's core assets including its national teams, along with all rights associated with the CPL".

The Canadian Premier League announced a number of new teams for its inaugural 2019 season, at present including York 9 FC (announced May 10), Cavalry FC (May 17),HFX Wanderers FC (May 25), Valour FC (June 6), FC Edmonton (June 8), Forge FC (July 12), and Pacific FC (July 20).

On November 14, the Canadian Premier League announced that it had acquired the Division 3 League1 Ontario.

Awards and honours 
Women's national team captain Christine Sinclair, was appointed to the Order of Canada on January 24.

Alphonso Davies and Christine Sinclair were named Canadian Player of the Year, while Davies was also named Postmedia Male Athlete of the Year.

National teams 

When available, the home team or the team that is designated as the home team is listed in the left column; the away team is in the right column.

Senior Men

2019–20 CONCACAF Nations League qualifying

Friendlies

Senior Women

2018 CONCACAF Women's Championship 

 finishes in  second place; qualifies for 2019 FIFA Women's World Cup.

2018 Algarve Cup 

 finishes in fifth place.

Friendlies

Domestic leagues

Division 1 leagues

Major League Soccer 

Three Canadian teams (Montreal Impact, Toronto FC, and Vancouver Whitecaps FC) play in this league, which also contains 20 teams from the United States.  It is considered a Division 1 men's league in the United States soccer league system.

Overall standings

National Women's Soccer League 

No Canadian teams play in this league, though eleven players from the Canada women's national soccer team are allocated to its teams by the Canadian Soccer Association.  It is considered a Division 1 women's league in the United States soccer league system.

Division 2 leagues

United Soccer League 

Two Canadian teams (Ottawa Fury FC and Toronto FC II) play in this league, which also contains 31 teams from the United States.  It is considered a Division 2 men's league in the United States soccer league system.

Eastern Conference

United Women's Soccer 

One Canadian team (Calgary Foothills WFC) plays in this league, which also contains 21 teams from the United States.  It is unofficially considered a Division 2 league in the United States soccer league system.

Women's Premier Soccer League 

One Canadian team (TSS Rovers FC) plays in this league, which also contains 106 teams from the United States.  It is unofficially considered a Division 2 league in the United States soccer league system.

Division 3 leagues

League1 Ontario (Men) 

17 teams play in this league, all of which are based in Canada.  It is considered a Division 3 men's league in the Canadian soccer league system.

League1 Ontario (Women) 

13 teams play in this league, all of which are based in Canada.  It is considered a Division 3 women's league in the Canadian soccer league system.

Première Ligue de soccer du Québec (Men) 

Eight teams play in this league, all of which are based in Canada.  It is considered a Division 3 league in the Canadian soccer league system.

Première Ligue de soccer du Québec (Women) 

Five teams play in this league, all of which are based in Canada.  It is considered a Division 3 league in the Canadian soccer league system.

Division 4 leagues

Premier Development League 

Five Canadian teams play in this league, which also contains 69 teams from the United States.  It is unofficially considered a Division 4 league in the United States soccer league system.

Heartland Division -  Thunder Bay Chill, WSA Winnipeg

Northwest Division -  Calgary Foothills FC, TSS FC Rovers, Victoria Highlanders

Non-FIFA leagues

Canadian Soccer League 
 
Fifteen teams play in this league, all of which are based in Canada. It is a Non-FIFA league previously sanctioned by the Canadian Soccer Association and is now a member of the Soccer Federation of Canada (SFC).

First Division  

Second Division

Domestic cups

Canadian Championship 

The Canadian Championship is a national cup contested by men's teams in divisions 1 through 3.

Challenge Trophy 

The Challenge Trophy is a national cup contested by men's teams at the division 4 level and below.

Jubilee Trophy  

The Jubilee Trophy is a national cup contested by women's teams at the division 4 level and below.

Canadian clubs in international competition

2018 CONCACAF Champions League 

 Toronto FC wins 2–0 on aggregate.

 Toronto FC draws 4–4 on aggregate, wins 2–1 on away goals.

 Toronto FC wins 4–2 on aggregate.

 Toronto FC draws 3–3 on aggregate, draws 2–2 on away goals, loses 4–2 on penalties, and finishes in second place.

References

External links 
 Canadian Soccer Association

 
Seasons in Canadian soccer
2018 sport-related lists